{{DISPLAYTITLE:C34H24O22}}
The molecular formula C34H24O22 (molar mass: 784.54 g/mol, exact mass: 784.075922 u) may refer to:
 Granatin A, an ellagitannin
 Pedunculagin, an ellagitannin
 Terflavin B, an ellagitannin